VJS may refer to:

 J Sharp
 Vishwa Jain Sangathan, a religious and social service organization in India

See also 

 
 VJ (disambiguation)
 JVS (disambiguation)
 JSV (disambiguation)
 SVJ (disambiguation)
 SJV (disambiguation)